David Chandos Brydges (born 1 July 1949 in Chester, UK) is a mathematical physicist.

Brydges received in 1976 his Ph.D. from the University of Michigan with thesis advisor Paul Federbush and thesis  A Linear Lower Bound for Generalized Yukawa Model Field Theories. Brydges was a professor at the University of Virginia and is now a professor emeritus (formerly holding a Canada Research Chair) at the University of British Columbia in Vancouver.

Brydges is concerned with mathematical quantum field theory and statistical mechanics. His research deals with functional integral techniques (including supersymmetry techniques), cluster development techniques, renormalization group methods on problems of static mechanics, and probabilistic problems. In 1985 he and Thomas C. Spencer introduced "lace expansion" for the analysis of the self-avoiding walk.

From 2003 to 2005, Brydges was president of International Association of Mathematical Physics. In 2007, he was elected a Fellow of the Royal Society of Canada. In 2010 he was, with Gordon Slade, an Invited Speaker at the International Congress of Mathematicians in Hyderabad.

Selected publications

References

External links
 Homepage

Mathematical physicists
University of Michigan College of Literature, Science, and the Arts alumni
University of Virginia faculty
Academic staff of the University of British Columbia
Fellows of the Royal Society of Canada
1949 births
Living people
Presidents of the International Association of Mathematical Physics